Defence Munitions (DM) Glen Douglas is a military munitions depot located near Loch Long, Argyll and Bute, in Scotland. It is operated by Defence Equipment & Support, part of the Ministry of Defence. It was formerly known as RNAD Glen Douglas.

History

The facility was built between 1962 and 1966. As of 1989, it served NATO as a pre-positioned wartime ammunition depot, storing around 40,000 tons of missiles, depth charges, and conventional shells.  It is now used only by the UK. The depot lies in Glen Douglas, a  glen through which the Douglas Water flows east to Loch Lomond.  The depot itself is near the glen's head, less than a mile from Loch Long. Arrochar is the nearest village.   

In the 1970s, a jetty was built at Glen Mallan on Loch Long, linked to the depot via a Ministry of Defence  (MoD) road.   

It was known as NATO Armament Depot Glen Douglas and was used for munitions storage by the Royal Navy, the United States and the Netherlands. In 1993 the US withdrew from the site and the capacity was taken up by Royal Air Force munitions which were previously based at RAF Chilmark in Wiltshire, the RAF's last munitions depot prior to its closure in 1995.

In January 2003, the aircraft carrier  docked at the Glen Mallan jetty to stock up on supplies ahead of the impending invasion of Iraq. With the tacit backing of trade union ASLEF, Motherwell based EWS drivers working on a MoD contract refused to transport munitions to the depot, in opposition to what they branded a "rush to war". The drivers' action was supported in an Early Day Motion in the House of Commons signed by 25 MPs.

Facilities

Northern Ammunition Jetty

The Northern Ammunition Jetty (also known as Glen Mallan Jetty) is located on the edge of Loch Long, around 3 miles south of the main depot, to which it is connected by a military road which climbs along the western flank of Craggan Hill. The jetty is capable of accommodating a variety of Royal Navy and Royal Fleet Auxiliary vessels so that they can be loaded and unloaded with munitions as well as other provisions such as food and spare parts. The explosives license for the jetty allows up to 440 tonnes of explosives to be handled there.  In 2020-21 the jetty was rebuilt to serve the s.

Rail connection
The depot is served by a branch railway line to the West Highland Line at the former Glen Douglas Halt railway station.

See also
Royal Naval Armaments Depot Coulport

References

External links
 Glen Douglas Munitions Depot  at Secret Scotland

Buildings and structures in Argyll and Bute
Installations of the Ministry of Defence (United Kingdom)
Scottish coast
Geography of Argyll and Bute
Ports and harbours of Scotland
Ammunition dumps in Scotland
NATO installations in the United Kingdom

no:Defence Equipment and Support